The Losers may refer to:

 The Losers (comics), a war comic book feature published by DC Comics starting in 1970
 The Losers (Vertigo), a comic published by DC Comics' Vertigo imprint, inspired by the original comic series
 The Losers (2010 film), an action film based on the Vertigo comic
 The Losers (1970 film), an American biker war film
 The Losers (TV series), an ITV sitcom from 1978 starring Leonard Rossiter
 The Losers (Howard Stern), a band made up of The Howard Stern Show cast members
 The Losers, a novel written by David Eddings and published in 1992

See also 
 The Loser (novel), a novel by Thomas Bernhard and originally published in German in 1983
 Loser (disambiguation)